The 2022–23 TNT Tropang Giga season is the 32nd season of the franchise in the Philippine Basketball Association (PBA).

Key dates
May 15: The PBA Season 47 draft was held at the Robinsons Place Manila in Manila.

Draft picks

Roster

Philippine Cup

Eliminations

Standings

Game log

|-bgcolor=ccffcc
| 1
| June 5
| Magnolia
| W 78–72
| Troy Rosario (22)
| Poy Erram (14)
| Jayson Castro (6)
| Smart Araneta Coliseum8,241
| 1–0
|-bgcolor=ffcccc
| 2
| June 9
| Blackwater
| L 78–85
| Roger Pogoy (32)
| Poy Erram (10)
| Kib Montalbo (4)
| Ynares Center
| 1–1
|-bgcolor=ccffcc
| 3
| June 12
| Converge
| W 86–83
| Jayson Castro (17)
| Troy Rosario (13)
| Castro, Pogoy (3)
| Ynares Center
| 2–1
|-bgcolor=ffcccc
| 4
| June 16
| NLEX
| L 89–90
| Roger Pogoy (28)
| Glenn Khobuntin (8)
| Jayson Castro (7)
| Ynares Center
| 2–2
|-bgcolor=ccffcc
| 5
| June 18
| Meralco
| W 78–71
| Roger Pogoy (19)
| Kelly Williams (9)
| Alejandro, Castro, Heruela (4)
| Ynares Center
| 3–2
|-bgcolor=ccffcc
| 6
| June 23
| Rain or Shine
| W 89–85 (OT)
| Troy Rosario (19)
| Kelly Williams (13)
| Mikey Williams (6)
| Ynares Center
| 4–2
|-bgcolor=ccffcc
| 7
| June 26
| Phoenix
| W 87–72
| Mikey Williams (27)
| Poy Erram (12)
| Mikey Williams (7)
| Ynares Center
| 5–2
|-bgcolor=ccffcc
| 8
| June 29
| NorthPort
| W 117–112
| Mikey Williams (27)
| Poy Erram (14)
| Jayson Castro (8)
| Smart Araneta Coliseum
| 6–2

|-bgcolor=ccffcc
| 9
| July 1
| Terrafirma
| W 114–86
| Mikey Williams (31)
| Poy Erram (9)
| Jayson Castro (7)
| Smart Araneta Coliseum
| 7–2
|-bgcolor=ffcccc
| 10
| July 7
| San Miguel
| L 99–115
| Kelly Williams (20)
| Kelly Williams (10)
| Matt Ganuelas-Rosser (4)
| Smart Araneta Coliseum
| 7–3
|-bgcolor=ccffcc
| 11
| July 10
| Barangay Ginebra
| W 106–92
| Roger Pogoy (30)
| Kelly Williams (9)
| Jayson Castro (8)
| Smart Araneta Coliseum10,308
| 8–3

Playoffs

Bracket

Game log

|-bgcolor=ccffcc
| 1
| July 27
| Converge
| W 116–95
| Mikey Williams (26)
| Troy Rosario (7)
| Mikey Williams (4)
| Smart Araneta Coliseum
| 1–0

|-bgcolor=ccffcc
| 1
| August 3
| Magnolia
| W 108–96
| Mikey Williams (26)
| Poy Erram (8)
| Castro, Pogoy (5)
| Smart Araneta Coliseum
| 1–0
|-bgcolor=ffcccc
| 2
| August 5
| Magnolia
| L 88–92
| Mikey Williams (28)
| Jayson Castro (8)
| Matt Ganuelas-Rosser (7)
| Smart Araneta Coliseum
| 1–1
|-bgcolor=ccffcc
| 3
| August 7
| Magnolia
| W 93–92
| Poy Erram (22)
| Glenn Khobuntin (9)
| Mikey Williams (10)
| Smart Araneta Coliseum
| 2–1
|-bgcolor=ccffcc
| 4
| August 10
| Magnolia
| W 102–84
| Poy Erram (19)
| Poy Erram (13)
| Mikey Williams (7)
| Smart Araneta Coliseum
| 3–1
|-bgcolor=ffcccc
| 5
| August 12
| Magnolia
| L 97–105
| Jayson Castro (18)
| Kelly Williams (10)
| Mikey Williams (6)
| Smart Araneta Coliseum
| 3–2
|-bgcolor=ccffcc
| 6
| August 14
| Magnolia
| W 87–74
| Jayson Castro (26)
| Kelly Williams (13)
| Mikey Williams (5)
| Smart Araneta Coliseum9,439
| 4–2

|-bgcolor=ccffcc
| 1
| August 21
| San Miguel
| W 86–84
| Roger Pogoy (26)
| Kelly Williams (9)
| Rosario, K. Williams (3)
| Smart Araneta Coliseum8,458
| 1–0
|-bgcolor=ffcccc
| 2
| August 24
| San Miguel
| L 100–109
| Roger Pogoy (28)
| Kelly Williams (9)
| Poy Erram (5)
| Smart Araneta Coliseum
| 1–1
|-bgcolor=ffcccc
| 3
| August 26
| San Miguel
| L 100–108
| Roger Pogoy (25)
| Poy Erram (15)
| Mikey Williams (5)
| SM Mall of Asia Arena
| 1–2
|-bgcolor=ccffcc
| 4
| August 28
| San Miguel
| W 100–87
| Jayson Castro (26)
| Poy Erram (8)
| Mikey Williams (6)
| Smart Araneta Coliseum10,569
| 2–2
|-bgcolor=ccffcc
| 5
| August 31
| San Miguel
| W 102–93
| Mikey Williams (23)
| Kelly Williams (9)
| Mikey Williams (5)
| Smart Araneta Coliseum
| 3–2
|-bgcolor=ffcccc
| 6
| September 2
| San Miguel
| L 96–114
| Roger Pogoy (31)
| Poy Erram (8)
| Kib Montalbo (5)
| Smart Araneta Coliseum
| 3–3
|-bgcolor=ffcccc
| 7
| September 4
| San Miguel
| L 97–119
| Jayson Castro (32)
| Jayson Castro (10)
| Jayson Castro (8)
| Smart Araneta Coliseum15,195
| 3–4

Commissioner's Cup

Eliminations

Standings

Game log

|-bgcolor=ffcccc
| 1
| October 5, 2022
| Magnolia
| L 92–94
| Cameron Oliver (43)
| Cameron Oliver (17)
| Cameron Oliver (5)
| Smart Araneta Coliseum
| 0–1
|-bgcolor=ccffcc
| 2
| October 8, 2022
| NorthPort
| W 117–93
| Roger Pogoy (32)
| Cameron Oliver (10)
| Mikey Williams (6)
| PhilSports Arena
| 1–1
|-bgcolor=ccffcc
| 3
| October 15, 2022
| Rain or Shine
| W 110–91
| Cameron Oliver (21)
| Poy Erram (9)
| Jayson Castro (6)
| Smart Araneta Coliseum
| 2–1
|-bgcolor=ffcccc
| 4
| October 19, 2022
| NLEX
| L 101–110
| Cameron Oliver (26)
| Cameron Oliver (22)
| Oliver, M. Williams (5)
| PhilSports Arena
| 2–2
|-bgcolor=ccffcc
| 5
| October 22, 2022
| Blackwater
| W 108–98
| Cameron Oliver (38)
| Cameron Oliver (10)
| Jayson Castro (7)
| PhilSports Arena
| 3–2
|-bgcolor=ffcccc
| 6
| October 28, 2022
| Converge
| L 117–130
| Cameron Oliver (41)
| Cameron Oliver (11)
| Mikey Williams (6)
| Smart Araneta Coliseum
| 3–3
|-bgcolor=ffcccc
| 7
| October 30, 2022
| Phoenix
| L 88–91
| Calvin Oftana (27)
| Cameron Oliver (10)
| Jayson Castro (6)
| Ynares Center
| 3–4

|-bgcolor=ccffcc
| 8
| November 5, 2022
| Terrafirma
| W 121–90
| Cameron Oliver (26)
| Cameron Oliver (15)
| Jayson Castro (6)
| Ynares Center
| 4–4
|-bgcolor=ffcccc
| 9
| November 16, 2022
| Meralco
| L 91–97
| Cameron Oliver (25)
| Cameron Oliver (20)
| Jayson Castro (7)
| Smart Araneta Coliseum
| 4–5
|-bgcolor=ffcccc
| 10
| November 20, 2022
| Barangay Ginebra
| L 85–89
| Mikey Williams (20)
| Calvin Oftana (10)
| Mikey Williams (5)
| Smart Araneta Coliseum
| 4–6
|-bgcolor=ffcccc
| 11
| November 23, 2022
| Bay Area
| L 108–140
| Matt Mobley (38)
| Poy Erram (12)
| Kelly Williams (3)
| PhilSports Arena
| 4–7
|-bgcolor=ffcccc
| 12
| November 26, 2022
| San Miguel
| L 99–119
| Roger Pogoy (23)
| Matt Mobley (7)
| Matt Mobley (7)
| PhilSports Arena
| 4–8

Governors' Cup

Eliminations

Standings

Game log

|-bgcolor=ccffcc
| 1
| January 25
| Phoenix
| W 123–119
| Jalen Hudson (34)
| Jalen Hudson (10)
| Jalen Hudson (7)
| Smart Araneta Coliseum
| 1–0
|-bgcolor=ccffcc
| 2
| January 27
| Rain or Shine
| W 105–100
| Hudson, M. Williams (24)
| Jalen Hudson (14)
| Mikey Williams (7)
| Ynares Center
| 2–0

|-bgcolor=ffcccc
| 3
| February 1
| NLEX
| L 108–110
| Jalen Hudson (39)
| Kelly Williams (13)
| Jalen Hudson (5)
| PhilSports Arena
| 2–1
|-bgcolor=ccffcc
| 4
| February 3
| Magnolia
| W 93–85
| Roger Pogoy (20)
| Calvin Oftana (10)
| Jalen Hudson (5)
| Ynares Center
| 3–1
|-bgcolor=ccffcc
| 5
| February 8
| Converge
| W 128–122
| Jalen Hudson (56)
| Jalen Hudson (12)
| Jalen Hudson (4)
| Smart Araneta Coliseum
| 4–1
|-bgcolor=ccffcc
| 6
| February 11
| Terrafirma
| W 131–109
| Jalen Hudson (36)
| Calvin Oftana (10)
| Mikey Williams (6)
| SM Mall of Asia Arena
| 5–1
|-bgcolor=ccffcc
| 7
| February 15
| Blackwater
| W 138–116
| Roger Pogoy (40)
| Rondae Hollis-Jefferson (13)
| Rondae Hollis-Jefferson (7)
| SM Mall of Asia Arena
| 6–1
|-bgcolor=ccffcc
| 8
| February 17
| Meralco
| W 111–104 
| Rondae Hollis-Jefferson (34)
| Rondae Hollis-Jefferson (11)
| Rondae Hollis-Jefferson (8)
| Smart Araneta Coliseum
| 7–1
|-bgcolor=ccffcc
| 9
| February 19
| San Miguel
| W 105–103 
| Jayson Castro (21)
| Rondae Hollis-Jefferson (14)
| Jayson Castro (8)
| PhilSports Arena
| 8–1

|- align="center"
|colspan="9" bgcolor="#bbcaff"|All-Star Break
|-bgcolor=ccffcc
| 10
| March 15
| NorthPort
| W 134–110 
| Rondae Hollis-Jefferson (31)
| Rondae Hollis-Jefferson (11)
| Mikey Williams (8)
| PhilSports Arena
| 9–1
|-bgcolor=ccffcc
| 11
| March 17
| Barangay Ginebra
| W 114–105  
| Rondae Hollis-Jefferson (34)
| Rondae Hollis-Jefferson (11)
| Mikey Williams (6)
| PhilSports Arena
| 10–1

Playoffs

Bracket

Transactions

Free agency

Signings

Trades

Mid-season

Recruited imports

References

TNT Tropang Giga seasons
TNT Tropang Giga